Air Tahiti Nui is the flag carrier of the French overseas collectivity of French Polynesia, with its head office in Papeete and its daily operations office in Faaa, Tahiti. It operates long-haul flights from its home base at Faa'a International Airport, with a fleet consisting of four Boeing 787 Dreamliners.

History 
Air Tahiti Nui was established on 31 October 1996 and commenced flight operations on 20 November 1998. It was the first international long-haul airline based in French Polynesia, which was formed to develop inbound tourism. The Government of French Polynesia is the major shareholder (84.4%) along with other local investors. Air Tahiti Nui had 782 employees around 2007.

After years running a deficit, Air Tahiti Nui faced possible bankruptcy in 2011. The President of French Polynesia, Oscar Temaru, called for all eligible workers in the territory help bail out the carrier by voluntarily paying a third of their income into a rescue fund. After four years of deficit, the company started making profits again in 2015.

In May 2015, Air Tahiti Nui announced its intention to replace its entire fleet, then consisting of five Airbus A340-300 aircraft. They would be replaced by four Boeing 787-9 aircraft, which would be delivered in 2018 and 2019. Air Tahiti Nui operated its last A340 service in September 2019.

In April 2018, in anticipation of its new fleet of Boeing 787-9s, Air Tahiti Nui launched its redesigned brandmark and updated typography. The redesigned logo is a joint collaboration between Future Brand and Polynesian contemporary artist Alexander Lee.

In March 2020, during the ongoing COVID-19 pandemic and as an impact of restrictions by the United States on international flights, Air Tahiti Nui operated the world's longest domestic flight with a lightly-loaded Boeing 787-9. The airline's flights between Papeete and Paris were later adjusted to make technical stops interchangeably between Pointe-à-Pitre and Vancouver International Airport.

Destinations

Overview
As of November 2021, Air Tahiti Nui serves the following destinations:

Codeshare agreements 
Air Tahiti Nui has codeshare agreements with the following airlines:

 Aircalin
 Air France
 Air New Zealand
 Alaska Airlines
 American Airlines
 Japan Airlines
 Korean Air
 LATAM Chile
 Qantas

The airline also codeshares with the SNCF, the French national railway operator.

Fleet

Current fleet 

, the Air Tahiti Nui fleet consists of the following aircraft:

Former fleet

Air Tahiti Nui formerly operated the following aircraft:

Livery
Air Tahiti Nui's aircraft livery over its history included different shades of blue representing the ocean, lagoon and sky of Tahiti for the upper half of the aircraft, extending the length of its fuselage, with white for the lower half as well as the aircraft's engines. The flag of French Polynesia is placed toward the front of the aircraft, behind the cockpit windows, with the aircraft's given name written underneath it. The flag is also incorporated into the livery's design, with red and white stripes that extend for part of the fuselage's length underneath the blue color. A tiare flower, the airline's logo, is placed onto the aircraft's vertical stabilizer (tailfin), with circular waves of alternating light and dark blues emanating from the flower, resembling water ripples.

With the introduction of the airline's Boeing 787-9 aircraft in October 2018, the airline's new livery incorporated markings derived from traditional Tahitian tattoos to the fuselage, the blue color used for most of the livery was changed to a darker shade, and the airline's name written on the forward fuselage was changed to the airline's new wordmark. However, despite the airline's tiare flower logo undergoing a visual change during the airline's overall rebranding, the logo used on the aircraft's tailfin was largely unchanged from the previous version.

Air Tahiti Nui's names for its aircraft are predominantly derived from various islands and atolls across French Polynesia, including Bora Bora, Fakarava, Mangareva, Moorea, Nuku Hiva, Rangiroa and Tetiaroa. An exception is F-ONUI, a Boeing 787-9 named after Tupaia, a historical Tahitian navigator.

References 
Citations

Bibliography
 "RAPPORT D’OBSERVATIONS DEFINITIVES SEML AIR TAHITI NUI Exercices 2008 à 2011." (Archive) Chambre territoriale des comptes de Polynésie française.

External links 

Airlines of France
Airlines of French Polynesia
Airlines established in 1996
Papeete
1996 establishments in Oceania